Little Kenosee Lake is a small lake in Moose Mountain Provincial Park in the Moose Mountain Uplands of the south-eastern corner of the Canadian province of Saskatchewan. The lake is in the Palliser's Triangle and Prairie Pothole Region of Canada. It is part of an endorheic basin lake system that flows into Kenosee Lake, which has only overflowed its banks once since records started being kept in the late 1800s. Most of the water that flows into Little Kenosee Lake comes from ground water run-off, such as from rain and melting snow. Fish Creek, the lake's outflow, is located on the southern shore. The lake and its facilities are accessed from Highway 219.

Recreation 

Little Kenosee Lake is the second largest lake in Moose Mountain Provincial Park and there are many recreational amenities in and around the lake. Along the south-eastern shore of the lake is the largest campground in the park, Fish Creek Campground. Along the southern shore is a picnic area with washrooms, a boat launch, and fishing dock. Jutting out of the southern shore is a large forested peninsula with a 3.4-kilometre loop hiking trail. In the winter, there's ice fishing and snowmobiling on the lake and surrounding trails.

Fish species 
Commonly found fish in Little Kenosee include yellow perch and walleye. The lake is stocked regularly with fish.

See also 
List of lakes of Saskatchewan
List of place names in Canada of Indigenous origin
Tourism in Saskatchewan

References

External links 

Tourism in Saskatchewan
Lakes of Saskatchewan
Wawken No. 93, Saskatchewan
Division No. 1, Saskatchewan